Vasile Mihăilescu (born 1936) was a Romanian footballer who played as a midfielder.

International career
Vasile Mihăilescu played one friendly game at international level for Romania, in a 3–2 away victory against Poland.

Honours
CCA București
Divizia A: 1959–60, 1960–61
Cupa României: 1961–62

Notes

References

1936 births
Romanian footballers
Romania international footballers
Association football midfielders
Liga I players
Liga II players
FC Progresul București players
FC Steaua București players
Living people